"Happy" is a song written, produced, and performed by American musician Pharrell Williams, released as the only single from the soundtrack album for the film Despicable Me 2 (2013). The song was first released on November 21, 2013, alongside a long-form music video. The song was reissued on December 16, 2013, by Back Lot Music under exclusive license to Columbia Records, a division of Sony Music. The song also served as the lead single from Williams' second studio album, Girl (2014).

The official remix features American rapper Sky Blu of LMFAO.

"Happy" is an uptempo soul and neo soul song on which Williams's falsetto voice has been compared to Curtis Mayfield's by critics. The song has been highly successful, peaking at No. 1 in the United States, United Kingdom, Canada, Ireland, New Zealand, and 19 other countries. It was the best-selling song of 2014 in the United States with 6.45 million copies sold for the year, as well as in the United Kingdom with 1.5 million copies sold for the year. It reached No. 1 in the UK on a record-setting three occasions and became the most downloaded song of all time in the UK in September 2014; it is the eighth-highest-selling single of all time in the country. It was nominated for an Academy Award for Best Original Song. A live rendition of the song won the Grammy Award for Best Pop Solo Performance at the 57th Annual Grammy Awards.

The music video for "Happy" was nominated for Best Male Video and Video of the Year at the 2014 MTV Video Music Awards. It also won the Grammy Award for Best Music Video at the 57th Annual Grammy Awards. The song was Billboards number-one single for 2014.

"Happy" was the most successful song of 2014, with 13.9 million units (sales plus equivalent streams) worldwide.

Background
Williams provided vocals for French duo Daft Punk's 2013 album Random Access Memories, on the songs "Lose Yourself to Dance" and "Get Lucky". After returning from the recording sessions in Paris, he attended a meeting with record label managers who said that the results were "spectacular" and that "Get Lucky" would be Daft Punk's next single. They also made Williams an offer to record his own album, to which he agreed quickly, "overwhelmed that someone wanted to know what's in my heart".

On December 17, 2013, it was announced that Williams had signed to Columbia Records and would release his second studio album in 2014.

Williams originally wrote the song for CeeLo Green and felt Green's recording of the song was better, but Elektra Records, Green's record label, decided against it since he was on the verge of releasing his Christmas album, Cee Lo's Magic Moment.

Composition

"Happy" was written and produced by Williams, with backing vocals by Rhea Dummett, Trevon Henderson, Ashley L. Lee, Shamika Hightower, Jasmine Murray and Terrence Rolle. The track was digitally edited and arranged by Andrew Coleman and Mike Larson, who also recorded it with assistance from Matthew Desrameaux at Circle House Studios in Miami, Florida. The song was later mixed by Leslie Brathwaite at Music Box Studios in Atlanta, Georgia.

"Happy" plays for 3 minutes and 53 seconds in common time and at a tempo of 156 beats per minute. The song is written in the key of F minor. Williams sings the upper notes in falsetto; his vocal range spans from F3 to C5. His singing on the track has been compared to that of Curtis Mayfield.

"Happy" is a mid-tempo soul and neo soul song. According to music journalist Paul Tingen, "Happy" is "a mid-tempo ... song in a faux-Motown style, with an arrangement that is, by modern standards, very sparse: programmed drums, one bass and one keyboard part, and handclaps both programmed and played, all topped off by Williams's lead vocals and a whole posse of backing vocals". Jody Rosen viewed the song as a "standout" with a "sprightly neosoul funk groove".

Critical reception

Jody Rosen of Rolling Stone gave it 3.5 stars and deemed it "an instant contender for 2013's Song of the Summer". In a 4/5 review, Renowned for Sound's Huw Woodward said, "Happy is a rather… well… happy affair with a cheerful beat and exuberant vocal that would indicate that the former N.E.R.D. singer is finding a lot of lighthearted fun to be had in both music and life. 'Because I'm happy, clap along if you feel like happiness is the truth' sings Williams as the jaunty rhythm gets your head nodding." Holly Williams of Contactmusic.com gave it four stars, praising it for being "unbelievably catchy" and "the kind of song that makes you want to dance and sing along".

Accolades
The song was nominated for Best Original Song at the 86th Academy Awards on March 2, 2014, but lost to "Let It Go" from Frozen. When GQ magazine asked Williams "how badly" he wanted the Oscar, he responded: "When they read the results, my face was...frozen. But then I thought about it, and I just decided just to... let it go."

In January 2015, "Happy" was ranked at No. 13 on The Village Voices annual year-end Pazz & Jop critics' poll.

"I like that song 'Happy'…" remarked Phil Collins. "It's a great groove, and he's a very smart guy."

Chart performance

Netherlands
In October 2013, a month prior to its release, "Happy" catapulted to No. 1 on the Dutch Top 40 chart in the Netherlands, partially as a result of radio station 3FM airplay and subsequent online downloads, as well as featuring in a Transavia commercial. It was released worldwide on November 21, 2013. In 2014, after 35 weeks on the charts and then still in the top 15, "Happy" became the most successful song in the Dutch Top 40 of all time.

United Kingdom
In the United Kingdom, "Happy" debuted at No. 71 on the UK Singles Chart on December 1, 2013. It then spent four weeks climbing before finally reaching No. 1 on December 29, becoming the final UK number one single of 2013. It became Williams' third No. 1 song in Britain, counting "Get Lucky" and "Blurred Lines", where he appeared as a featured artist. It has since spent four non-consecutive weeks at No. 1, reaching the peak on three separate occasions. In doing so, Williams became only the third artist ever to achieve this, and the first since Guy Mitchell in 1957 with "Singing the Blues". Following the single's third week at No. 1, it spent five weeks in the top three before returning to the summit, boosted by his performance at the 2014 Brit Awards. In the same week that "Happy" returned to No. 1 for the third time, it sold its millionth copy in the UK, Williams' third in under a year, having previously done so with Daft Punk's "Get Lucky" in June 2013, and Thicke's "Blurred Lines" in July 2013. This made Williams only the second artist in UK chart history (the first being The Beatles) to have three singles sell 1 million copies in under a year, as well as only the third artist ever to have three million-sellers, along with The Beatles (who have six) and Rihanna (who has four).

"Happy" was the best-selling single of UK in 2014, with 1.5 million copies sold for the year, and became the most downloaded song of all time in the UK by September 2014, with over 1.62 million sold. It had also been streamed over 25 million times and was the first song released in the 2010s to go 3× Platinum. With the inclusion of streaming, "Happy" has achieved combined sales of over 2 million. Additionally, "Happy" and Idina Menzel's "Let It Go" became the first singles ever to spend an entire calendar year on the official UK top 75 chart. On June 12, it was announced that "Happy" had overtaken "Evergreen" by Will Young as the UK's best-selling single of the 21st century, with sales of 1.81 million. "Happy" spent 92 weeks in the UK top 100. , the song has sold 1,950,000 copies.

New Zealand

On the New Zealand Singles Chart, "Happy" debuted at No. 11 on December 23, 2013. The next week it moved to No. 2. Then on January 6, 2014, "Happy" began a 12-week consecutive reign in the No. 1 position, right up until March 24, 2014. It then dropped to No. 2 for one week, then spent a further three weeks at No. 1, bringing the total number of weeks at No. 1 to fifteen, breaking the 36-year-long record for most weeks spent at No. 1, previously held by Boney M.'s "Rivers of Babylon". , "Happy" had spent 62 straight weeks in the New Zealand Top 40 since its debut, before finally dropping out of the chart the following week. The song has been certified 6× Platinum in New Zealand.

United States
"Happy" reached the top of the US Billboard Hot 100 for the week ending March 8, 2014, giving Williams his fourth No. 1 single on the chart, and his first as lead artist. It took twelve years and a week (as the issue date is March 8, 2014) to achieve his first Hot 100 No. 1 hit as a lead artist. The song remained at No. 1 the following week, and also topped the Hot 100 Airplay chart. The song also holds the record for the second-highest audience peak for a week on the Hot 100 Airplay, with 225.9 million impressions while Robin Thicke's "Blurred Lines", a song in which Pharrell was featured as well as produced and co-wrote, holds the all-time record. The song remained at the No. 1 position longer than any other song in the calendar year. The single passed its 4 million sales mark in April 2014, the first song of 2014 to do so.

On the week of May 17, 2014, after spending ten weeks at the summit, "Happy" was finally knocked off number one by John Legend's "All of Me" down to the No. 2 spot. "Happy" became the 28th song in the history of the chart to reach this milestone. It spent a total of 22 weeks in the top 10, entering on the week-ending February 15, 2014 and departing on July 19, 2014. The song sold 5,633,000 copies in the US in the first six months of 2014, the most ever of any song in the first six months of any calendar year. It was also the best-selling song of 2014 in the US with 6.45 million copies sold for the year, and has sold over 6.9 million total copies in the US .

Other charts

The song also topped the charts of 22 other countries, including Australia, Austria, Canada, France, Germany, Ireland, Italy, Poland and Spain. It has spent twelve weeks (including seven consecutive) at No. 1 in Ireland, making it the third song in less than a year to spend more than seven weeks at No. 1, after Robin Thicke's "Blurred Lines" and Avicii's "Wake Me Up!". In France, "Happy" spent 22 weeks at No. 1, the longest reign at the top of the Syndicat National de l'Edition Phonographique, beating Lou Begas "Mambo No. 5", which spent 20 weeks at No. 1 in 1999.

Music video
To coincide with the single release, the website 24hoursofhappy.com was launched. It features a visual presentation of "Happy" advertised as being "the world's first 24-hour music video." The video was directed by the French directing team We Are from LA with creative director Yoann Lemoine, and shot by steadicam operator Jon Beattie. It consists of the four-minute song repeated multiple times, with various people dancing around Los Angeles and miming along. The website allows users to navigate to various points in the 24-hour timeframe, including all 360 four-minute segments.

A four-minute edit of the video was also released onto the iamOTHER and Pharrell's own YouTube channel on November 21, 2013 and January 8, 2014 respectively; both videos have received over 1 billion views as of January 2023. It was nominated for Best Male Video and Video of the Year at the 2014 MTV Video Music Awards. The 24-hour music video for "Happy" was also projected at the Buenos Aires International Festival of Independent Cinema in April 2014.

"Happy" tribute videos
The original video spawned many cover videos on YouTube in which people from different cities throughout the world dance to the song. Those videos are usually called "Pharrell Williams – Happy – We Are from [name of the city]". , more than 1,500 videos have been created. Inspired by this global phenomenon, a French couple launched a website wearehappyfrom.com to showcase the remakes.

In April 2014, the Embassy of the United States, Yerevan, Armenia released a video titled "Happy Yerevan", directed by Artyom Abovyan featuring US ambassador John A. Heffern and several Armenian celebrities, such as singers André, Emmy and Aram Mp3. The same month artsmedia Albania produced a music video for the track featuring inhabitants of Tirana. The video soon became popular in Albania and caused controversy over the usage of images of Albanian First Secretary Enver Hoxha.

Arrests in Iran for tribute
In May 2014, a group of Iranian fans who created a tribute to "Happy" were arrested. According to a police chief, the song represented vulgarity and also hurt public chastity. Williams responded to the arrest in a tweet stating "It's beyond sad these kids were arrested for trying to spread happiness." Soon after Iran's President Hassan Rouhani criticized the arrest when he tweeted "#Happiness is our people's right. We shouldn't be too hard on behaviours caused by joy." The dancers, along with the director, were later released. It was reported on September 19, 2014, that seven of the individuals in the Iranian video had been handed sentences, suspended for three years, of 91 lashes each along with jail by Iranian courts.

"Weird Al" Yankovic parody
In 2014, American musician "Weird Al" Yankovic parodied "Happy" as "Tacky" on his fourteenth studio album Mandatory Fun. The song mocks questionable style in fashion as well as activities considered gauche. Yankovic recorded the song as one of the last on Mandatory Fun, and received Williams' approval directly, through email. He remarked he was "honored" to have his work spoofed by Yankovic. The song's one-shot music video parodies "Happy", and was the first in a series of eight videos released over eight days in promotion of Mandatory Fun. It features cameo appearances by Aisha Tyler, Margaret Cho, Eric Stonestreet, Kristen Schaal, and Jack Black, and was produced by Nerdist Industries.

Credits and personnel
Recording
Recorded at Circle House Studios, Miami, Florida
Mixed at Music Box Studios, Atlanta, Georgia

Personnel
Pharrell Williams – lead vocals, background vocals, keyboards, drums, bass guitar, writing, production
Rhea Dummett – backing vocals
Trevon Henderson – backing vocals
Ashley L. Lee – backing vocals
Shamika Hightower – backing vocals
Jasmine Murray – backing vocals
Terrence Rolle – backing vocals
Amir Windom - A&R
Mike Larson – recording, digital editing, arrangement
Matthew Desrameaux – recording assistant
Andrew Coleman – digital editing, arrangement
Leslie Brathwaite – mixer
Reuben Cohen – mastering

Charts

Weekly charts

Year-end charts

Decade-end charts

All-time charts

Certifications

Release history

See also

Billboard Year-End Hot 100 singles of 2014
List of Airplay 100 number ones of the 2010s
List of best-selling singles
List of best-selling singles in Australia
List of best-selling singles of the 2000s (century) in the United Kingdom
List of Billboard Hot 100 number-one singles of 2014
List of Billboard Hot 100 top 10 singles in 2014
List of Billboard Mainstream Top 40 number-one songs of 2014
List of Canadian Hot 100 number-one singles of 2014
List of Dutch Top 40 number-one singles of 2013
List of million-selling singles in the United Kingdom
List of Billboard Adult Contemporary number ones of 2014
List of number-one Billboard Streaming Songs of 2014
List of number-one digital songs of 2014 (Canada)
List of number-one digital songs of 2014 (U.S.)
List of number-one digital tracks of 2014 (Australia)
List of number-one hits of 2013 (France)
List of number-one hits of 2014 (Austria)
List of number-one hits of 2014 (Denmark)
List of number-one hits of 2014 (France)
List of number-one hits of 2014 (Germany)
List of number-one hits of 2014 (Italy)
List of number-one hits of 2014 (Switzerland)
List of number-one R&B/hip-hop songs of 2014 (U.S.)
List of number-one singles of 2014 (Australia)
List of number-one singles of 2014 (Finland)
List of number-one singles of 2014 (Ireland)
List of number-one singles of 2014 (Poland)
List of number-one singles of 2014 (Slovenia)
List of number-one singles of 2014 (South Africa)
List of number-one singles of 2014 (Spain)
List of number-one streaming tracks of 2014 (Australia)
List of top 10 singles in 2013 (France)
List of top 100 singles of 2014 (France)
List of Top 25 singles for 2014 in Australia
List of UK Independent Singles Chart number ones of 2013
List of UK top 10 singles in 2013
List of UK top 10 singles in 2014
List of Ultratop 50 number-one singles of 2014
List of songs which have spent the most weeks on the UK Singles Chart
New Zealand top 50 singles of 2014

References

External links
24 Hours of Happy music video website
We Are Happy from X tribute video website

2013 songs
2013 singles
American soul songs
APRA Award winners
Back Lot Music singles
Billboard Hot 100 number-one singles
Canadian Hot 100 number-one singles
Columbia Records singles
Despicable Me
Dutch Top 40 number-one singles
Irish Singles Chart number-one singles
Music videos directed by Yoann Lemoine
Neo soul songs
Number-one singles in Australia
Number-one singles in Denmark
SNEP Top Singles number-one singles
Number-one singles in Germany
Number-one singles in Greece
Number-one singles in Hungary
Number-one singles in Israel
Number-one singles in Norway
Number-one singles in Poland
Number-one singles in Romania
Number-one singles in Russia
Number-one singles in Switzerland
Pharrell Williams songs
Record Report Pop Rock General number-one singles
Song recordings produced by Pharrell Williams
Songs written for films
Songs written by Pharrell Williams
South African Airplay Chart number-one singles
South Park songs
UK Singles Chart number-one singles
Songs written for animated films
Grammy Award for Best Pop Solo Performance
Grammy Award for Best Short Form Music Video